The Tanzanian woolly bat or Dobson's painted bata (Kerivoula africana) is a species of vesper bat in the family Vespertilionidae.
It is found only in Tanzania. Locally, it is known as the "popo" or "tunge".

Taxonomy and etymology
It was initially described by Irish zoologist George Edward Dobson in 1878.
He described the species based on a specimen collected by French zoologist Achille Raffray in 1875 in Zanzibar.
Its species name "africana" is a New Latin derivative of Latin āfricānus, meaning "African".

Description
In his 1878 description of the species, Dobson stated that its ears and tragus were similar in appearance to that of Hardwicke's woolly bat, Kerivoula hardwicki.
It lacks fur between its eyes, but has a fringe of longer hairs along its lips.
Its dorsal fur is bicolored, with the base of individual hairs dark brown and the tip grayish brown.
Fur on the ventral surface is also bicolored, but the color is lighter overall.
At the time of its description, it was the smallest species of its genus known.

Range and habitat
It is endemic to Tanzania, and is only found on the country's eastern coast.
Its natural habitat is subtropical or tropical moist lowland forests.
It is threatened by habitat loss.
Coastal wetlands are lost via conversion to subsistence agriculture and coastal forests being subject to logging by the timber industry and local use.

Conservation
It is currently evaluated as endangered by the IUCN, a designation it has maintained since 2004.
From 1988 to 1996, it was evaluated as possibly extinct, and from 1996 to 2004 it was evaluated as data deficient.
In 1999, MacPhee and Flemming considered it allegedly extinct since roughly 1878, though it was rediscovered shortly after their paper was published, in 2000.
In addition to habitat destruction, this species is also threatened by collection for use in traditional medicine.
The Sukuma people believe that pneumonia can be treated by burning the body of a Tanzanian woolly bat and inhaling the smoke.
One bat is supposed to be burned and inhaled per day for three days.

References

External links
Photographs of the skull of the holotype, in the Paris Museum of Natural History Collections

Kerivoulinae
Bats of Africa
Taxa named by George Edward Dobson
Mammals described in 1878
Taxonomy articles created by Polbot